The Priory of Le Plessis-Grimoult is a former Augustinian monastery established in the 12th century in Le Plessis-Grimoult in the department of Calvados, Normandy, France. The ruins were listed as a monument historique (national heritage site) in 1928, and the nearby archaeological site and the remains of the fortified garden in 1996.

History

Establishment
In 1047, the local baron, Grimoult du Plessis, was executed for an attempted coup against William the Bastard (later William the Conqueror), the Duke of Normandy, and his lands were given to the duke's half brother, Odo, the Bishop of Bayeux, to become part of his diocese. In 1131, the local church was dedicated to Saint Stephen.

Around 1135, William's former chaplain, Richard Samson, better known as Richard of Dover, was the local priest. He brought a community of canons regular to Le Plessis-Grimoult and in so doing became the first prior there. The canons lived in Samson's own presbytery at that time. In 1153, under Richard's successor, the canons moved to Champ Osburt. Under Prior Henri I, the canons moved again to the château de Vire. The church building and priory in its current location were built in the late 13th century under the direction of Prior Guillaume Causson, Henri I's successor. Only the priory's gate remains standing today.

Under Bossuet
Jacques-Bénigne Bossuet became the tutor to the Grand Dauphin in 1671. The time his new position required him to spend at court meant he could no longer serve as Bishop of Condom. Because of this, he lost access to all the monetary benefits he was entitled to as bishop and could not afford to live the lavish lifestyle that came with living at court. To compensate his son's tutor, Louis XIV appointed him to be the prior of Le Plessis-Grimoult. This provided Bossuet with a steady income, without requiring too much of his time.

During his time as prior, he had a dispute with Julian de Saint-Germain, the priest of Maisoncelles-la-Jourdan, over the collection of tithes. There was a trial on 18 August 1677, which found that Saint-Germain had to pay Bossuet an annual sum of 230 livres in exchange for Bossuet giving up his right to collect tithes in Maisoncelles.

Priors
The priory had 35 priors from its foundation to the nationalization of church property during the French Revolution.

Architecture

In 1830 the building consisted of a transept terminating in an apse. There were several columns with capitals which dated back to the 13th century. The choir was older than the tower. The roof was non-existent by 1830, having most likely been made of wood. The western wall of the cloister was still standing. Two doors open onto the gallery of the cloister. The capitals of the columns are from the end of the 14th or the 15th century. In the other rooms on the ground floor, the octagonal columns have capitals that are perhaps from the 14th century. There is a beautiful fireplace in a room that is believed to be the kitchen. Gardens and ponds are farther to the east. To the west of the outer courtyard of the priory, there is a doorway that dates to about the 13th or 14th century.

Parishes served
The priory served the parishes of Le Plessis-Grimoult, Roullours, Carville, Chênedollé, Truttemer-le-Grand, Montsecret, Sainte-Honorine-la-Chardonne, Saint-Jean-le-Blanc, Campandré, Montchauvet, Frênes, Saint-Vigor-des-Mézerets, Périgny, Cauville, Proussy, Bernières-le-Patry, Maisoncelles-la-Jourdan, Estry, Saint-Christophe-de-Chaulieu, Beauchêne, Clairefougère, Saint-Cornier-des-Landes, Saint-Jean-des-Bois, Saint-Quentin-les-Chardonnets, Yvrandes, Bonnemaison, Courvaudon, Feuguerolles-Bully, Fontaine-Étoupefour, Rosel, La Cambe, Osmanville, Mondrainville, Noyers-Bocage, Planquery, Saint-Germain-d'Elle, Bretteville-le-Rabet, Campeaux and Colombelles.

References

Augustinian monasteries in France
Monuments historiques of Calvados (department)
Former Christian monasteries in France
Tourist attractions in Calvados (department)